Henry Alexander (1763 – 6 May 1818) was an Irish politician from County Londonderry.

Alexander was educated at Trinity College, Dublin. who sat in the Parliament of Ireland until its abolition under the Act of Union 1800 and then in the Parliament of the United Kingdom. He was returned as a Member of Parliament for the rotten borough of Old Sarum in the 1802 election.

He was the brother of James Alexander, who was also a Member of Parliament for Old Sarum, and who bought the patronage of the borough in 1820 from their cousin, The 2nd Earl of Caledon. He was also the brother of Josias du Pré Alexander.

References 
 

1763 births
1818 deaths
Politicians from County Londonderry
Irish MPs 1783–1790
Irish MPs 1790–1797
Irish MPs 1798–1800
Members of the Parliament of the United Kingdom for County Limerick constituencies (1801–1922)
UK MPs 1801–1802
Members of the Parliament of the United Kingdom for English constituencies
UK MPs 1802–1806
Members of the Parliament of Ireland (pre-1801) for County Down constituencies
Members of the Parliament of Ireland (pre-1801) for County Limerick constituencies
Members of the Parliament of Ireland (pre-1801) for County Londonderry constituencies
Alumni of Trinity College Dublin